Al-Jinan ("The Gardens") was an Arabic-language political and literary bi-weekly magazine established in Beirut by Butrus al-Bustani and active between 1870 and 1886. Written largely by Butrus' son Salim, it finally ceased to appear because of the growing difficulties of writing freely under the rule of Abdülhamid.

Al-Jinan had a pan-Arab political stance. It was the first important example of the kind of literary and scientific periodicals which began to appear in the 1870s in Arabic alongside the independent political newspapers. The magazine was also one of the earliest Arabic magazines which covered narrative fiction such as novels, novellas and short stories.

Three years after its start Al-Jinan had nearly 1500 subscribers. The readers of the magazine included the leading Muslim merchant families in Beirut. It also had readers in Palestine.

References

1870 establishments in Ottoman Syria
1886 disestablishments in the Ottoman Empire
Arabic-language magazines
Biweekly magazines
Defunct literary magazines
Defunct magazines published in Lebanon
Defunct political magazines
Magazines established in 1870
Magazines disestablished in 1886
Magazines published in Beirut
Pan-Arabist media
Literary magazines published in Lebanon